Invasion is a 1997 thriller novel by American author Robin Cook. The book was adapted into the 1997 miniseries of the same name.

Plot
From the icy vastness of outer space, an alien virus arrives on earth contained in a tiny black disk. Those who pick up the disk are infected by the virus which spreads rapidly with flu like symptoms. The first human to pick up the disk and be infected is Beau Stark, an ambitious 21-year-old young man. The virus starts by giving him flu like symptoms but within a few hours he is not only free of the symptoms but also infused with new energy and power. His girlfriend Cassy notices major personality changes and an obsession with environment. The man who was all for banning big dogs in the city suddenly acquires one and proceeds to infest it. The virus apparently infects all life forms on earth.  Meanwhile, the first invasion & infestation having succeeded the disk sends a signal, inviting millions more disks to come.  Those who handle the disks receive a sting, soon followed by flu-like symptoms and ending in what could be called "zombie assimilation" into an alien collective consciousness with Beau being the leader.

Cassy however shares her fears of Beau's changing personality with their mutual friend and her ex-boyfriend Pitt, who is a medical student and concerned after witnessing a sudden upsurge in deaths of people, suffering from chronic diseases such as diabetes. He takes Cassy to meet his senior Dr. Shiela who is also concerned about the preventable and unexplained deaths and surging number of flu cases. Cassy also tells them about personality changes reported in some people by one of her students, Jonathan. Jonathan introduces the group to his parents Nancy & Eugene, a virologist and a physicist.  Jesse, a cop, also comes in contact with the group when he accompanies a colleague suffering sudden seizures to the hospital.

The group finally zeros on the disks as being the carriers of the infection and deduces that this may be alien virus and decides to take the matter to the CDC. Nancy, Eugene & Shiela travel to the CDC headquarters, but discover to their horror that the entire board is already infected. While attempting to escape, Eugene is engulfed by one of the disks that is also a powerful weapon which emits radiation and can create a black hole. 
The two women make it back to the others and the group flees to a remote cabin owned by Jesse. Meanwhile, The final wave of disks infest the entire earth slowly infecting people all over the world and killing those with any genetic disease.

The group contacts other hidden groups who are working on means to combat the virus. However, they soon have to make forays to the town for research supplies and food. On one such foray, Jesse is consumed by the disk just like Eugene, Nancy is infected and Cassy is carried off by the infected to Beau, who is unable to cope with the human emotions and is pining for her. Jonathan, Pitt, and Shiela abandon their hideout and go looking for a Dr. M who has made advances in isolating the virus.

Cassy is taken to Beau who informs her that this invasion had been planned for a very long time as the disks only activate the virus which was planted in human DNA 3 billion years ago when life was just evolving on earth. Every million years, the virus activator protein is sent to earth to judge the suitability of its inhabitants as hosts to the virus. This time the hosts have been most suitable and are in the process of building a transporter, which would link Earth to the other planets infested by the virus and allow travel between all those planets. He shows Cassy the transporter under construction and then proceeds to infect her, telling her that he loves her and wants her to be a part of the alien consciousness. The strain makes Cassy faint and when she wakes up, she is horrified by what she would become once the virus takes control. She flees from the place with hopes of contacting her friends and informing them what they are up against. Cassy contacts the group, who has hooked up with Doctor Harlan McCay, who has a Biological Warfare Research Lab at his disposal. When the invasion started, Dr. McCay headed to the lab, which was left over from the Cold War. The lab is stocked and was at least somewhat staffed (the staff apparently left when they got infected) and although it was a secret, the local Native Americans knew about it and had at some point in time informed him of it.  The lab had everything they needed to work on a cure for the virus. 
Dr. McCay discloses that he also was stung by the disk, but has prevented an infection by injecting himself with a monoclonal antibody that at least temporarily prevents the virus from taking hold of the host. Cassy is brought to the facility and given an infusion of the monoclonal antibody. While experimenting they discover that infecting themselves with another virus will cause the virus to expose itself and oxygen will destroy it, since it came to Earth 3 billion years ago when there was little to no oxygen so its vulnerable to it in a viral state. After testing this with infected mice (it cures all except the one infected the longest, who dies; apparently if it's in the system too long, the cure kills), they take a cold virus that has never been encountered before (it was artificially engineered, and, thus, no one will have immunity) as it is mild enough to not kill the person infected but will do the job.  Dr. McCay acts as the guinea pig and exposes himself to the virus in a containment unit. Beau, in the meanwhile, has discovered that Cassy has escaped and unable to overcome his human emotions, follows and discovers the facility but has to leave before he can find Cassy as the gateway is encountering problems.  He leaves a few of his associates behind to deal with the humans.

The group escapes the facility and storms the mansion, smashing the gateway with a car. Beau is too far gone to be cured and tells them to run as the destruction of the gateway would cause dispersion. He dies and the mansion is destroyed but they are able to spread the cure and the invasion is halted.

1997 American novels
Novels by Robin Cook
American thriller novels
American novels adapted into television shows
1997 science fiction novels
American science fiction novels